Barbona is a comune (municipality) in the Province of Padua in the Italian region Veneto, located about  southwest of Venice and about  southwest of Padua.

The municipality of Barbona contains the frazione (subdivision) Lusia.

Barbona borders the following municipalities: Lusia, Rovigo, Sant'Urbano, Vescovana.

Demographic evolution

References

Cities and towns in Veneto